The 2021 Camping World SRX Series was the inaugural season of the Superstar Racing Experience. The six-race season started at Stafford Motor Speedway on June 12 and ended at the Nashville Fairgrounds Speedway on July 17, with Tony Stewart being crowned the inaugural series champion.

Drivers

Full-time drivers

Part-time drivers

Guest drivers

Notes
 Nine-time Formula One race winner and 2015 FIA World Endurance Championship champion Mark Webber was initially announced as a full-time driver, but travel restrictions and schedule changes related to the COVID-19 pandemic forced those plans to be cancelled.
 Tony Kanaan was initially supposed to run all six races. However, due to scheduling conflicts with the 2021 Stock Car Brasil Championship, he did not participate in the races at Knoxville and Slinger and was replaced by Hailie Deegan in both of those races.

Schedule
Stewart's track Eldora Speedway was the first venue to be revealed, on November 13, 2020. Two more tracks were announced in December, with Lucas Oil Raceway in suburban Indianapolis on December 9 and Stafford Motor Speedway in Connecticut on December 19. The full schedule was released on January 4, 2021.

Broadcasting
All six races were broadcast live by CBS in the United States and were also streamed on Paramount+. The broadcast team consisted of former NASCAR on NBC and NASCAR on ESPN play-by-play Allen Bestwick along with a rotating color commentator (Dario Franchitti (1 race), James Hinchcliffe (3 races) and Danica Patrick (2 races) in the booth. Former ESPN and NBC studio analyst Brad Daugherty and former NASCAR on Fox pit reporter Matt Yocum were the two pit reporters. Former NASCAR on TNT pit reporter and NASCAR Race Hub studio host Lindsay Czarniak was the host.

Season summary
All events consist of two heat races, with the lineup for Heat 1 being determined by a random draw. The results of Heat 1 are inverted to determine the lineup for Heat 2. At Stafford, the heat races were 15 minutes each, but were shortened to 12 minutes for Knoxville onwards. The results of the second heat determined the lineup for the feature race at Stafford; the average finish of both heats was used from Knoxville onwards.

At Stafford, the feature race had a duration of 100 laps, including caution period laps, with unlimited attempts at a green–white–checker finish. For Knoxville and Eldora, the duration was changed from 100 laps to 50 green-flag-only laps. Lucas Oil had a 76-lap feature, with Slinger showcasing a 150-lap main event and Nashville's feature lasting 77 laps.

Stafford Motor Speedway
Greg Biffle won the pole for Heat 1 based on a random draw. He held on to win the heat over Bobby Labonte at the end of the 15-minute time limit, leading all 36 laps. The field was inverted for the second 15-minute heat, with Doug Coby passing Michael Waltrip for the win with two to go. Coby, a real estate agent who participates in Modified races in the Northeast, then led 84 laps of the 100-lap feature, winning the event ahead of Biffle and Tony Stewart.

Heat 1 Top 5 Results:

Heat 2 Top 5 Results:

Feature Top 5 Results:

Knoxville Raceway
Tony Stewart started on pole for heat 1 and led for the entire 12-minute session, which consisted of 23 laps. Michael Waltrip and Willy T. Ribbs started up front for the second heat. Hélio Castroneves passed for the lead early and led until three minutes left, getting passed by Scott Bloomquist on a restart. The heat was extended due to a green-white-checker finish after Paul Tracy spun and hit the wall with 40 seconds left; Bloomquist went on to win. Stewart started on the pole for the 50-lap feature, based on average finishing positions from the two heats. Paul Tracy fell out early after overheating, and several cautions flew for spins during the first quarter of the race. Waltrip passed Stewart for the lead on lap 14; Stewart regained the lead on lap 21. Bloomquist was spun by Castroneves on lap 33, bringing out another caution; Bill Elliott stalled on track during the caution and was pushed to pit road, falling eleven laps behind. Stewart held off Hailie Deegan and Ernie Francis Jr. to win.

Heat 1 Top 5 Results:

Heat 2 Top 5 Results:

Feature Top 5 Results:

Eldora Speedway
Tony Kanaan started at the front for the first 12-minute heat and led for the first four minutes before being passed by Tony Stewart, who went on to win the heat after holding off a late challenge from Hélio Castroneves. The second heat was marred by accidents and completed only 11 green-flag laps before the time limit. Willy T. Ribbs began up front following the field inversion, leading the first three laps. While battling for second Ernie Francis Jr. spun Kanaan, also collecting Michael Waltrip and Kody Swanson and causing Stewart to spin. Francis, Waltrip, and Swanson all failed to finish the heat. The race restarted with six minutes remaining, with Marco Andretti battling Scott Speed for the lead. Ribbs spun Paul Tracy on the backstretch, collecting himself, Kanaan, and Stewart. Speed and Andretti continued to battle on the ensuing restart with two minutes left; Andretti went on to win ahead of Tracy and Stewart, both of whom recovered from earlier spins.

Stewart started on pole for the feature but elected to drop to the back during the pace laps. Second-place starter Paul Tracy led the first 25 laps of the 50-lap race. Two cautions flew in the first half of the race, including one for a spinning Tony Kanaan. Kody Swanson took over the lead on lap 26 until the third caution on lap 34. Tracy retook the lead on the restart and led two laps before relinquishing the top spot back to Swanson. Stewart took the lead on lap 44, and on lap 46 third-place Bobby Labonte was spun by Tracy in turn one, collecting Marco Andretti and Bill Elliott. Labonte and Elliott failed to finish the race. Stewart and Swanson battled on a restart with five laps left, with Stewart ultimately winning the feature.

Heat 1 Top 5 Results:

Heat 2 Top 5 Results:

Feature Top 5 Results:

Lucas Oil Raceway
Scott Speed started on pole for the first heat alongside Michael Waltrip. Speed went on to win after leading the entire heat. Willy T. Ribbs started up front for the second heat, but Paul Tracy took the lead at the start, leading for the first two minutes. Hélio Castroneves passed for the top spot and led the remainder of the heat, followed by Bobby Labonte, who passed Tony Stewart with two laps to go.

Unlike the previous two races with 50-lap features during which caution laps did not count, the feature at Lucas Oil was 76 laps, with caution laps counting except during the final six laps. Stewart started on the pole but was passed by Speed on lap 2. Ernie Francis Jr. passed Stewart for second and took over the lead from Speed on lap 13. The first caution flew on lap 27 due to the series' "green flag lap limit". After the restart on lap 34, Francis quickly pulled away from Speed, the pair leading the way until another caution flew at lap 49. Francis retained the lead on the lap 55 restart, ahead of Speed, Labonte, and Castroneves. The third caution flew on lap 67, and Speed took over the lead on the restart. With seven laps to go, Tony Kanaan spun on the backstretch, resulting in a fourth caution. Francis and Speed battled side by side for three laps before Speed slid into the wall. With two laps remaining, Tracy was spun by Bobby Santos III in turn 2 and Speed was spun into the wall by Castroneves in turn 3 in retaliation for contact the lap before. On the first green-white-checker attempt, Francis cleared Labonte and went on to win.

Heat 1 Top 5 Results:

Heat 2 Top 5 Results:

Feature Top 5 Results:

Slinger Speedway
Marco Andretti drew the pole position for the first 12-minute heat. With two minutes remaining, sixth-place Paul Tracy was spun by Ernie Francis Jr. Tracy's right-front tire went flat on the restart, bringing out another caution as time expired. Andretti went on to win after holding off Tony Stewart on the ensuing restart. Willy T. Ribbs began the second heat up front, but spun about 20 seconds into the race, leaving Bill Elliott with the lead. Hailie Deegan took the lead on the restart, but another caution quickly waved after Michael Waltrip was rear-ended by Hélio Castroneves. Deegan jumped out to a large lead on the restart, leading until another caution waves with five minutes remaining. Greg Biffle took the lead with two minutes left and went on to win while holding off Deegan and Francis.

Andretti and Luke Fenhaus made up the front row for the 150-lap feature and battled side by side for the lead until Fenhaus prevailed on lap 24. Stewart took the lead briefly on lap 32 but was held off by Fenhaus. After battling side-by-side, Fenhaus prevailed over Stewart just before a caution came out at lap 45. After the lap 54 restart, Fenhaus and Stewart swapped the lead several times before Stewart prevailed at lap 76. Fenhaus then regained the lead at lap 80, and the two continued battling side by side. A caution flew at lap 92 with Stewart gaining the edge over Fenhaus and Andretti. After the restart ten laps later, Fenhaus took the lead, and a caution waved for Michael Waltrip a few laps later. Following the restart at lap 112, Stewart and Fenhaus battled for the lead as Francis, Tracy, and Deegan made contact multiple times back in the field. The leaders continued to race side-by-side before Fenhaus again prevailed on lap 132. After a caution flew at lap 135, the race began to only count green-flag laps. Biffle and Castroneves spun on the restart with 12 laps remaining. Fenhaus and Andretti cleared Stewart with ten to go, and a caution flew with two laps left when Deegan spun Tracy while racing for fourth, with Tracy collecting Waltrip, Ribbs, and Castroneves. Tracy and Waltrip failed to finish the feature. Andretti passed Fenhaus on the green-white-checker restart and went on to win ahead of Fenhaus and Stewart.

Heat 1 Top 5 Results:

Heat 2 Top 5 Results:

Feature Top 5 Results:

Nashville Fairgrounds Speedway
Bill Elliott and Chase Elliott started on the front row for heat 1. Bill led for the majority off the heat, fending off a late challenge from Chase to win. For heat 2, Willy T. Ribbs and Michael Waltrip started up front. Waltrip led the first six laps before Hélio Castroneves took over the top spot. He went on to win the heat ahead of Ernie Francis Jr. Tony Stewart clinched the series championship after the second heat, maintaining a large enough points lead over Francis.

For the feature, Bill Elliott again started on pole, with Labonte joining him at the front. Elliott maintained the lead over Castroneves until the first caution waved at lap 26. After the restart at lap 32, Elliott maintained the lead, with Chase Elliott moving into second. Bill held off Chase until the second caution of the race flew at lap 50. On the lap 55 restart, Bill ran high in turn two, allowing Chase and Stewart to move into the top spots. The third caution flew on lap 57 when Willy T. Ribbs spun after contact with Paul Tracy. Ribbs failed to finish the feature. Following the lap 61 restart, Chase maintained the lead over Stewart and Bill. The fourth caution flew on lap 71, and the race restarted with seven laps remaining. On lap 73, Paul Tracy spun Marco Andretti from fifth place, the fifteenth incident involving Tracy during the season. Elliott maintained the lead with five laps to go. Elliott went on to win, with Stewart clinching the championship in second, and Bill Elliott finishing third.

Heat 1 Top 5 Results:

Heat 2 Top 5 Results:

Feature Top 5 Results:

Results and standings

Race results

Drivers' championship
(key) * – Most laps led (feature). 1 – Heat 1 winner. 2 – Heat 2 winner.

Points are awarded for both heat races as well as the feature:

See also
 2021 NASCAR Cup Series
 2021 NASCAR Xfinity Series
 2021 NASCAR Camping World Truck Series
 2021 IndyCar Series
 2021 ARCA Menards Series
 2021 ARCA Menards Series East
 2021 ARCA Menards Series West
 2021 NASCAR Whelen Modified Tour
 2021 NASCAR Pinty's Series
 2021 NASCAR PEAK Mexico Series
 2021 NASCAR Whelen Euro Series
 2021 eNASCAR iRacing Pro Invitational Series

References

External links
 

Superstar Racing Experience
SRX Series
SRX Series
SRX Series